Duhat, Laguna, may refer to:
Duhat, a barangay in Santa Cruz, Laguna, a first class urban municipality and capital of the province of Laguna in the Philippines
Duhat, an urban barangay in Cavinti, a third class municipality in the province of Laguna in the Philippines